La Acebeda is municipality of the autonomous community of the Community of Madrid in central Spain. It has a population of 62 inhabitants (INE, 2011).

Public transport 

La Acebeda has two bus lines. One of them communicates with Madrid although it only works on weekends. Those lines are:

196: Madrid - La Acebeda

191B: Buitrago - Somosierra

External links

References

Municipalities in the Community of Madrid